Haseki Sultan (Ḫāṣekī Sulṭān) was the title used for the chief consort of an Ottoman Sultan. In later years, the meaning of the title changed to "imperial consort". Hürrem Sultan, principal consort and legal wife of Suleiman the Magnificent, was the first holder of this title. The title lost its exclusivity under Ibrahim I, who bestowed it upon eight women simultaneously. The title haseki sultan was used until the 17th century. After that, kadınefendi became the highest ranking title for imperial consorts, although this title was not as prestigious as haseki sultan.

Term 
The word haseki (خاصکي-خاصگی) comes from the Arabic word Khassa خاصه which is suffixed with the Persian gi گی and means "to attribute something exclusively to". Haseki is, therefore, one who belongs exclusively to the sultan.

Sultan (سلطان) is an Arabic word,  that indicates "authority" or "dominion". starting from the 16th century, this title was carried by both men and women of the Ottoman dynasty. Thus, replacing other titles by which prominent members of the imperial family had been known (notably hatun for women and bey for men). This usage underlines the Ottoman conception of sovereign power as family prerogative.

Westerns know the Ottoman ruler as "sultan", but the Ottomans also used Persian terms such as  "padişah" (emperor) or "hünkar" to refer to their ruler. The emperor's formal title consisted of "sultan" together with "han" (for example, Sultan Suleiman Han). In formal address, the sultan's children were also entitled "sultan", with imperial princes (şehzade) carrying the title before their given name, and imperial princesses carrying it after. Examples include Sultan Suleiman's son Şehzade Sultan Mehmed and his daughter Mihrimah Sultan. Like imperial princesses, the living mothers and main consorts of the reigning sultan carried the title "sultan" after their given names, for example, Hafsa Sultan, Suleiman's mother and first valide sultan, and Hürrem Sultan, Suleiman's chief consort and first haseki sultan. The evolving usage of this title reflected power shifts among imperial women, especially during the Sultanate of Women. As the position of the chief consort eroded over the course of the 17th century, the main consort lost the title "sultan", which was replaced by "kadin", a title related to the earlier "hatun". Henceforth, the mother of the reigning sultan was the only person of non-imperial blood to carry the title "sultan".

Title haseki carried before or after given name. According to a genealogical website, the formal way of addressing a haseki is Devletlû İsmetlu (given name) Haseki Sultân Aliyyetü'ş-Şân Hazretleri. The title “sultan” was often translated to sultana, which does not exist in Ottoman royalty, possibly to distinguished female members of the dynasty from the male sultan.

Usage in Ottoman royalty 
During the early period of the usage of haseki, this title was held by the chief consort of the sultan with special status, and surpassed other titles and ranks by which the prominent consorts of the sultans had been known (hatun and kadin). A haseki sultan had an important place in the palace, being the second most powerful woman and enjoyed the greatest status in the imperial harem after valide sultan and usually had chambers close to the sultan's chamber. Haseki Sultan's position, used for a century, reflected the great power of imperial consorts, who were former slaves, in the Ottoman court, elevating their status higher than the Ottoman princesses, and making them the equals of the empress consorts in Europe.

When the position of valide sultan was vacant, a haseki could take valide's role, have access to considerable economic resources, become chief of the imperial harem, sultan's advisor in political matters, and even have an influence on foreign policy and on international politics. These cases happened during Hürrem Sultan, Nurbanu Sultan, Safiye Sultan and Kösem Sultan's eras.

Hürrem, the first imperial consort who became haseki sultan, was given several special rights during her tenure, especially after the death of Suleiman's mother, Hafsa Sultan, the first valide sultan, in 1534. Hürrem was allowed to give birth to more than one son, which was a stark violation of the old imperial harem principle of "one concubine mother — one son" that was designed to prevent both the mother's influence over the sultan and the feuds of the blood brothers for the throne. In 1525 or 1526 (the exact date is unknown), Suleiman married Hürrem in a magnificent formal ceremony, making him the first Ottoman Sultan to wed since Mehmed II (reign 1451–1481), and violating a 200-year-old custom of the Ottoman imperial house according to which sultans were not to marry their concubines (Mehmed's legal wife was a free noble woman, Sittişah Hatun). Later, Hürrem became the first prince's mother to remain in the Sultan's court for the duration of her life. In the Ottoman imperial family tradition, a sultan's consort was to remain in the harem only until her son came of age (around 16 or 17), after which he would be sent away from the capital, accompanied by his mother, to govern a faraway province. Hürrem became Suleiman's partner not only in household, but also in state affairs. Thanks to her intelligence, she acted as Suleiman's chief adviser, and she seems to have had an influence upon foreign policy and international politics. Hürrem's great power signaled the rise of the chief imperial consort under the title of haseki.

A mother's political role traditionally began with the creation of a separate household for her son. The establishment of her public politic identity entailed her separation from the sultan and his household. As noted above, this kind of functional division appears to have occurred with Nurbanu Sultan, in spite of the fact that she never left the sultan's household like her predecessor Hürrem, the shift in her role, that is, their assumption of candidly political role as haseki may well have coincided with their sons’ assumption of their political posts.

Even though it became a great position, haseki was not used during reign of Mehmed III, son of Murad III. Probably due to the prominent role played by his mother, Safiye Sultan. 

Haseki was used again during the reign of Mehmed's son Ahmed. The career of Ahmed was very much like that of Suleiman. He chose his second or third consort, Kösem, as his haseki. Kösem's career was similar to that of Hürrem in an important respect. Like Hürrem, Kösem is blamed for acting to preserve her own power rather than that of the sultan or of the dynasty. It is certainly worth nothing that the two women of the dynasty to suffer the harshest judgment by history had two things in common: the absence of a valide sultan during most of their career as haseki and an unusually large number of sons. What appears to have earned them their unsavory reputation was their power to influence the fate of the empire by favoring one of their sons over another.

The greatest contribution of Kösem during her tenure as haseki possibly was the significant modifications in the pattern of succession to the throne from a system of primogeniture to one based on agnatic seniority. She must have realized the personal gain that might stem from the transition to seniority, coupled with the fact that she was no longer haseki but had son "in waiting". According to Venetian ambassador, Kösem "lobbied to spare Mustafa the fate of fratricide with the ulterior goal of saving her own son from the same fate." This new system meant that potential rulers had to wait a long time in the kafes before ascending the throne, hence the old age of certain sultans upon their enthronement, made all of şehzades lost their chance to become ruler of one of the Ottoman province as part of their training to become worthy heir to the throne.

Decline of the Haseki 
One outcome of all these changes was that the position of haseki lost its traditional logic. A mother's political role traditionally began with the creation of a separate household for her son. The establishment of her public political identity entailed her separation from the sultan and his household. But when under agnatic seniority, şehzades lost access to public adulthood, their mothers lost their public roles as well. It went against the protocol of the dynastic politics to publicly honor the mother of the son who had yet to achieve public identity. The position of haseki as a true favorite of the sultan was thus incompatible with the practice of agnatic seniority.

Kösem Sultan was the last of the influential Ottoman hasekis. The other explanation for the decline of the haseki and the re-emergence of the valide in the first decades of the seventeenth century has much to do with Kösem Sultan's personality and the fact that in 1617 she had ceased being a haseki, and if she were to regain power, she could obtain it only from the position of Valide Sultan.

After Ahmed I's death in 1617, the position of Haseki Sultan lost its special status. Osman II had a consort with haseki rank, but all that can be determined about her is that her name was Ayşe. As with Osman, very little is known about the concubines of his brother Murad IV. Privy purse registers record the presence of a single haseki, Ayşe, until the very end of Murad's seventeen years reign, when a second haseki appears. It is possible that Murad had only a single concubine until the advent of the second one, or that he had a number of concubines but singled out only two of them as hasekis. Ibrahim had eight hasekis, of whom the first three – Turhan, Aşub, and Muazzez – each had one son.

The presence of more than one haseki was a significant change in the reign of Murad and Ibrahim, signaling that the age of the haseki was coming to an end. With Kösem's strong personality and influence as valide sultan, the title haseki sultan which was held by eight women simultaneously, and all şehzades lost their provincial post during Ibrahim's era and it made title haseki lose its special status. In this period the meaning of the title began to shift from a "chief consort" and "single favorite" to something more general like "imperial consort", similar to the earlier hatun.

The title haseki sultan was only used for around a century until the 17th century. After that, kadın became highest rank for the imperial consorts again, used with title "First Name" Kadın (Efendi). The last woman in Ottoman history who used the title of "Haseki Sultan" was Rabia Sultan, Haseki of Sultan Ahmed II (reign 1691-1695).

List of Hasekis 
The title was first used in the 16th century for Hürrem Sultan, also known as Roxelana, when she was given favor by Suleiman the Magnificent. She was his chief consort and the mother of Selim II. Hürrem Sultan was married to Sultan Suleiman, becoming both his legal wife. The title was next held by Nurbanu Sultan, favourite consort and wife of Selim II, and the mother of the next Sultan Murad III. In 1575, just after Murad's accession, Safiye Sultan became the haseki and was given a higher rank than the sultan's own sisters, Ismihan Sultan, Gevherhan Sultan and Şah Sultan.

Leslie P. Peirce points out that during Mehmed III's reign, the title haseki did not came in use. However, according to the contemporary historian Mustafa Selaniki, Mehmed had a haseki, who was mother of a son, and died of plague in July 1598, early in his reign. Mehmed's son Ahmed I gave the title haseki to Kösem Sultan, his favourite consort and legal wife and the mother of Sultans Murad IV and Ibrahim and dominated the Ottoman Empire early 17th century. Osman II has one haseki, Ayşe Sultan. Privy Purse registers record the presence of Ayşe as Murad IV's only haseki, until the very end of Murad's seventeen-year reign, when a probraly second haseki appears. But still the hasekis continued to rank higher than princesses. Ibrahim had eight hasekis; Turhan, Aşub, Muazzez, Ayşe, Mahienver, Șivekar, Saçbağli and Hümaşah Sultan. Ibrahim's son and successor is known to have one haseki, Gülnuş Sultan. Suleiman II didn't have a haseki. His brother Ahmed II had one haseki Rabia Sultan.

See also
List of Ottoman titles and appellations
List of mothers of the Ottoman sultans
List of consorts of the Ottoman sultans
Harem
Valide Sultan
Kadınefendi
Hanımefendi
Sultana (title)

Notes

Footnotes

References
 
 
 

Concubines of the Ottoman Empire
Consorts of Ottoman sultans
Ottoman Empire-related lists
Lists of royalty
Lists of queens
Turkish words and phrases
Slaves from the Ottoman Empire
16th-century women from the Ottoman Empire